New Hope High School (NHHS) is located in New Hope, Alabama, United States.  It is part of the Madison County Schools system. The current principal is David Manning. Enrollment as of the end of the 2021 school year is 600 students in grades 7-12.

Sport programs
 Baseball
 Soccer
 Basketball 	
 Softball
 Cheerleadering
 Football 	
 Golf
 Marching band
 Volleyball
 Color Guard

Clubs 
 Future Business Leaders of America (FBLA)
 Fellowship of Christian Students (FCS)
 Future Farmers of America (FFA)
 Anchor Club
 Student Government Association (SGA)
 Yearbook Staff
 Fine Arts Club
 Family, Community, and Career Leaders of America (FCCLA)
 National Honor Society

Notable alumni
 Howard Cross, class of 1985, former professional tight end in the NFL
 Nancy Worley, class of 1969, former Alabama Secretary of State Alabama State Government 
 Rudy Ford, class of 2013, safety for the Green Bay Packers

References

External links

Madison County School District
The Spotlight – the school's former monthly newspaper
New Hope High welcomes several new faculty, staff

Public high schools in Alabama
Schools in Madison County, Alabama